Donald Erik Sarason (January 26, 1933 – April 8, 2017) was an American mathematician who made fundamental advances in the areas of Hardy space theory and VMO. He was one of the most popular doctoral advisors in the Mathematics Department at UC Berkeley. He supervised 39 Ph.D. theses at UC Berkeley.

Education
B.S. in Physics from the University of Michigan in 1955.
Master's degree (A.M.) in Physics from the University of Michigan in 1957.
Ph.D. in Mathematics from the University of Michigan in 1963.  Doctoral thesis supervised by Paul Halmos.

Career
Postdoc at the Institute for Advanced Study in 1963–1964, supported by a National Science Foundation Postdoctoral Fellowship.
Then Sarason went to the University of California Berkeley as an Assistant Professor (1964–1967), Associate Professor (1967–1970) and until his retirement, Professor (1970–2012).

Accomplishments
Sarason was awarded a Sloan Fellowship for 1969–1971.

Sarason was the author of 78 mathematics publications spanning the fifty years from 1963 to 2013. Sarason was the sole author on 56 of these publications; the other 22 publications were written with a total of 25 different co-authors.

The huge influence of Sarason’s publications on other mathematicians is reflected in unusually high citation rates. Google Scholar shows that Sarason’s publications have been cited over four-thousand times in the mathematical literature.

Sarason wrote an amazing total of 456 reviews for Mathematical Reviews/MathSciNet. These reviews were published from 1970 to 2009.

Teaching awards from UC Berkeley Mathematics Undergraduate Student Association, 2003 and 2006.

At various times, served on the editorial boards of Proceedings of the American Mathematical Society, Integral Equations and Operator Theory, and Journal of Functional Analysis.

Selected works
1967.
Sarason reproved a theorem of G. Pick on when an interpolation
problem can be solved by a holomorphic function that maps the disk to
itself; this is often called Nevanlinna-Pick interpolation. Sarason’s approach not only gave a natural unification of the Pick
it led to the Commutant Lifting theorem of Sz.-Nagy and Foiaş which inaugurated an operator theoretic approach to many problems in function theory.

1975. Functions of Vanishing Mean Oscillation.
Sarason’s work played a major role in the modern development of function
theory on the unit circle in the complex plane.
Sarason’s paper called attention
to outstanding open questions concerning algebras of functions on the unit
circle. Then in an important 1975 paper that has since been cited by
hundreds of other papers, Sarason introduced the space VMO of functions
of vanishing mean oscillation. A complex-valued function defined on the
unit circle in the complex plane has vanishing mean oscillation if the average
amount of the absolute value of its difference from its average over an interval
Thus VMO is a subspace of the set of functions with bounded mean oscillation, called BMO.
Sarason proved that
the set of bounded functions in VMO equals the set of functions in 
Extensions of these ideas led to

1978. Function Theory on the Unit Circle. Notes for lectures at a conference at Virginia Polytechnic Institute and State University, Blacksburg, Virginia, June 19–23, 1978.
On June 19–23, 1978, Sarason gave a series of ten lectures at a conference hosted by Virginia Polytechnic Institute and State University
(now Virginia Tech) on analytic function theory on the unit circle.
In these lectures he discussed a number of recent results in the field,
bringing together classical ideas and more recent ideas from functional
analysis and from the extension of the theory of Hardy spaces to higher
dimensions. The lecture notes, entitled Function Theory on the Unit
Circle were made available by the math department at VPI. Though
only available as a mimeographed document, they circulated widely
and were very influential. Of all his publications, these lecture notes
are the fifth most frequently cited according to the bibliographic database MathSciNet.

1994. Sub-Hardy Hilbert Spaces in the Unit Disk.
This influential book developed the theory of the 
de Branges–Rovnyak spaces , which were first
introduced in de Branges and Rovnyak.
Sarason pioneered
the abstract treatment of contractive containment and established a fruitful connection between the spaces  and the ranges of certain
Toeplitz operators. Using reproducing kernel Hilbert space techniques, he gave elegant proofs of the Julia–Carathéodory and the Denjoy–Wolff theorems. Two
recent accounts of the theory are Emmanuel Fricain and Javad Mashreghi and Dan Timotin.

2007. Complex Function Theory: Second Edition. The American Mathematical Society.
This textbook for a first course in complex analysis at the advanced undergraduate level provides an unusually clear introduction to the theory of analytic functions.

References

External links 
 

1933 births
2017 deaths
Scientists from Detroit
University of Michigan College of Literature, Science, and the Arts alumni
University of California, Berkeley alumni
Mathematicians from Michigan
Sloan Research Fellows